Fall River United was a name used by two United States soccer clubs, based in Fall River, Massachusetts. Both teams played in the American Soccer League, one during the 1921–22 season and other during the 1933–34 season.

History

Fall River United I
In 1921 the Southern New England Soccer League and the National Association Football League effectively merged to form the American Soccer League. As a result of this merger Fall River Rovers of the SNESL were disbanded and a new team  Fall River United were formed to enter the ASL.  In a pre-season game on July 21, 1921 a team that included Chick Albion, Tommy McFarlane and Harry Ratican, held Third Lanark to a 2–2 draw. Ratican scored United’s opening goal. Third Lanark featured many guest players from other Scottish teams and was virtually a Scottish League XI. They played 25 games during their North American tour, winning them all until they played United in the final game. However, during the subsequent 1921–22 season United struggled, finishing sixth out of eight during the inaugural ASL season. They were on the verge of folding when they were taken over by Sam Mark who then relaunched them as Fall River Marksmen.

Fall River United II
The name was revived during the 1933–34 season by a team that played in the New England Division of the American Soccer League. Other teams in the division included another Fall River Rovers.

Year-by-year

References

Fall River Marksmen
United
Defunct soccer clubs in Massachusetts
American Soccer League (1921–1933) teams
American Soccer League (1933–1983) teams